Antheraea oculea, known generally as the western Polyphemus moth or Arizona Polyphemus moth, is a species of silkmoth in the family Saturniidae. It is found in Central America and North America.

The MONA or Hodges number for Antheraea oculea is 7757.1.

References

Further reading

External links

 

Antheraea
Articles created by Qbugbot
Moths described in 1883